The 1897 Quebec general election was held on May 11, 1897, to elect members of the Legislative Assembly of the Province of Quebec, Canada. The Quebec Liberal Party, led by Félix-Gabriel Marchand, defeated the incumbent Quebec Conservative Party, led by Edmund James Flynn.

This marked the start of over 39 consecutive years in power for the Liberals. The Conservative Party never held power again in Quebec, and ceased to exist in 1936 when it merged with the Action libérale nationale to form the Union Nationale, which formed a government later that year.

Marchand died in office in 1900, and was succeeded by Simon-Napoléon Parent as Liberal leader and premier.

Additional Assembly seat
An Act passed in 1895 provided for the Îles-de-la-Madeleine to be separated from Gaspé for the subsequent election, and thus elect their own MLA.

Results

See also
 List of Quebec premiers
 Politics of Quebec
 Timeline of Quebec history
 List of Quebec political parties
 9th Legislative Assembly of Quebec

References

Quebec general election
Elections in Quebec
General election
Quebec general election